The International Gymnastics Federation (French: Fédération Internationale de Gymnastique, FIG) is the body governing competition in all disciplines of gymnastics. Its headquarters is in Lausanne, Switzerland. It was founded on July 23, 1881, in Liège, Belgium, making it the world's oldest existing international sports organisation. Originally called the European Federation of Gymnastics, it had three member countries—Belgium, France and the Netherlands—until 1921, when non-European countries were admitted and it received its current name.

The federation sets the rules, known as the Code of Points, that regulate how gymnasts' performances are evaluated. Seven gymnastics disciplines are governed by the FIG: artistic gymnastics, further classified as men's artistic gymnastics (MAG) and women's artistic gymnastics (WAG); rhythmic gymnastics (RG); aerobic gymnastics (AER); acrobatic gymnastics (ACRO); trampolining (TRA); Double mini trampoline (DMT), tumbling (TUM) and  parkour. Additionally, the federation is responsible for determining gymnasts' age eligibility to participate in the Olympics.

After the 2022 Russian invasion of Ukraine, FIG barred Russian athletes and officials, including judges. It also announced that "all FIG World Cup and World Challenge Cup events planned to take place in Russia ... are cancelled, and no other FIG events will be allocated to Russia ... until further notice." FIG also banned the Russian flag at its events.

Organization
The main governing bodies of the federation are the president and vice presidents, the Congress held every two years, the Executive Committee, the Council, and technical committees for each of the disciplines.

, there were 148 national federations affiliated with FIG, one of which have been suspended, as well as one associated federation, one provisional federation and the following five continental unions:
 European Union of Gymnastics (UEG)
 Pan-American Gymnastic Union (PAGU)
 Asian Gymnastic Union (AGU)
 African Gymnastics Union (UAG)
 Oceania Gymnastics Union (OGU)

Across all disciplines, participation in FIG sanctioned events exceeds 30,000 athletes, about 70% of whom are female.

Presidents, and their tenures, of the FIG

Morinari Watanabe was elected president of the organization since 2017.

Competitions

According to the technical regulations of the International Gymnastcs Federation, the competitions officially organized by FIG are:
 World Gymnastics Championships
World Artistic Gymnastics Championships
 World Rhythmic Gymnastics Championships
 Trampoline and Tumbling World Championships
 Aerobic Gymnastics World Championships
 World Acrobatic Gymnastics Championships
 Parkour World Championships

 World Cup series
 Artistic Gymnastics World Cup
 Rhythmic Gymnastics World Cup
 Trampoline World Cup
 Acrobatic Gymnastics World Cup
 Aerobic Gymnastics World Cup
 Parkour World Cup
 World Challenge Cup series
 Artistic Gymnastics World Challenge Cup
 Rhythmic Gymnastics World Challenge Cup

Other official FIG competitions include:
 Olympic Games
 Youth Olympic Games
 World Games
 Junior World Gymnastics Championships
 Junior World Artistic Gymnastics Championships
 Junior World Rhythmic Gymnastics Championships
 World Age Group Competitions

Defunct events formerly organized of sanctioned by FIG:
 Four Continents Gymnastics Championships
 Junior World Acrobatic Gymnastics Championships
 Olympic Games Test Events

Age eligibility rules

The FIG regulates the age at which gymnasts are allowed to participate in senior-level competitions. The purpose is to protect young gymnasts. This has caused some controversy, and there have been cases of age falsification.

See also
 Major achievements in gymnastics by nation
 International Trampoline Federation

References

External links
 

 
Gymnastics organizations
International sports bodies based in Switzerland
Organisations based in Lausanne
Sports organizations established in 1881
1881 establishments in Belgium